The Fourth Dimension is an album by organist Jack McDuff recorded in 1973-74 and released on the Cadet label.

Track listing 
All compositions by Jack McDuff except as indicated
 "Layin' Back" - 6:45   
 "Rolling Stone" (Oliver Sain) - 4:37   
 "The Fourth Dimension"  4:20   
 "Half Breed" (Mary Dean, Al Capps) - 4:08   
 "The City Bump" - 7:38   
 "All Is Fair in Love" (Stevie Wonder) - 6:25   
 "Show Casing" - 6:10

Personnel 
Jack McDuff - organ, electric piano, clavinet, piano 
Joe Newman, Richard Williams, Jon Faddis - trumpet 
Garnett Brown - trombone 
Harold Vick - tenor saxophone (solo on track 1) 
Joe Farrell - tenor saxophone, flute (solo on track 6) 
Seldon Powell, Babe Clark - baritone saxophone 
Pee Wee Ellis - soprano saxophone, tenor saxophone (solo on track 3), flute (solo on track 5) 
Joe Beck, Eric Johnson, Jimmy Ponder - guitar 
Wilbur Bascomb, Gordon Edwards - electric bass 
Grady Tate - drums, congas 
Norman Pride - congas 
Jean DuShon - vocals

References 

Jack McDuff albums
1974 albums
Cadet Records albums
Albums produced by Esmond Edwards